A list of manga published by Kodansha (and his subsidiaries Kobunsha and Scola), listed by release date.

1930s

1931
Norakuro

1933
Bōken Dankichi

1934
Tank Tankuro

1935
Hinomaru Hatanosuke

1940s

1946
Putcher in Wonderland

1949
Anmitsu Hime

1950s

1950
Kimba the White Lion

1951
Age of Adventure
Ambassador Atom

1952
The Adventure of Rock
Astro Boy
Rock on Volcano Island
Skyscraper Kid

1953
The 13 Secrets
Princess Knight
Sing, Penny

1954
’32 Ford
Chief Detective Kenichi
The Devil of the Earth

1956
The Crane’s Fountain
Phoenix
Tetsujin 28-go

1957
Whirlwind Z

1958
Angel in the Dark
Hurricane Z
Moonlight Mask
Peacock Shell
The Twin Knights

1959
13-Gō Hasshin Seyo
Apatchi Tōshu
Bōken Senchō
Donguri March
Hayate Jūjisei
The Merchant of Venice'''Mon Yoshi-kunŌnishi KyojinPatorōru QRyōta wa MakenaiSakon UkonSandaru SantaSong of the White PeacockTenji DojiTsuppari Tarō1960s
1960Angel's HillBanzai Tantei-chōChampion FutoshiChikai no MakyūGeGeGe no KitarōKaiketsu HarimaoKuroi Himitsu HeikiMahha SanshirōOhana-chanShiden-kai no Taka1961Fushigi na shōnenGaroro QSasukeThe Strange Boy19621•2•3 to 4•5•RokuYuki no Taiyou19638 ManAkuma-kunShiden-kai no Taka1964Marude DameoNinja Hattori-kunPia no ShouzouSarutobi Ecchan1965Giant MamaHangyojinHarris no KazeJajako-ChanRainbow Sentai RobinSpace Boy Soran1966AkumuCyborg 009KagehimeKuroi NekomenMisokkasuReptiliaStar of the Giants1967Chibikko Kaiju YadamonNana to LiliTensai Bakabon1968Activist StudentAkane-chanAshita no Joe Bravo! SenseiHana no SanshiroKoya no KenmanMini Mini Manga Dai-KoshinPansy-chanReceive-chanSanbiki no KenmanTiger MaskYuhi no Kenman1969BiancaKaze no Yō niTriton of the Sea1970s
1970Abandon the Old in TokyoAkogareAttention PleaseBarom-1Bomba!Hulk: The MangaSkull ManSpider-Man: The Manga1971Dekkai Chanto AtsumareDemon Lord DanteKarate MasterMad Dog TrotskyMon Cherie Coco1972Ashita KagayakuDevilmanLay of the RhineLord Iechika MogamiMama no OjisamaOld Folk's HomeSamurai ExecutionerSuekko TaifuuYakyū-kyō no Uta1973Ai to MakotoAries no Otome-tachiCutie HoneyFisherman SanpeiHotaru MinakoMazinger ZOnward Towards Our Noble DeathsOre wa TeppeiThe Record of Peter KürtenSensual NightsViolence Jack1974Great MazingerHitoribocchi RucaIyahaya NantomoLove PackPath of the AssassinTeki wa Tsuyoi Zo Tegowai Zo!The Three-Eyed One1975BC AdamBoy Detective ZumberaCandy CandyHaikara-San: Here Comes Miss ModernSteel JeegUchu Enban Daisenso1976GrendizerLady MitsukoNonnon Plus 3ShutendojiUFO Robot Grendizer vs. Great Mazinger1977Apollo's SongBlack JackCrime and PunishmentThe Film Lives OnLion BooksManga CollegeMetamorphosisNextworldOde to KirihitoThe Plains of AbusegaharaSeito Shokun!The Shinsen-gumiSon-Goku the MonkeyUmi no Aurora1978AlabasterBenkeiCaptain KenThe Castle of DawnDove, Fly Up to HeavenFusukeFutureman KaosGrand DollsJet KingMessage from Space: Galactic WarsMicromanNemuta-kunQueen EmeraldasRally Up, Mankind!Shōnen JidaiShumari Super TaiheikiTiger BooksTonda CoupleThe White PilotZero Men1979The Ant and the GiantBrave DanCoquelicot-zaka karaDr. ThrillDust 8FaustFlying BenThe Fossil IslandGeneral OnimaruThe Golden TrunkInsect CollectorInsect Collector - The Butterfly Road Smells of DeathThe Iron RoadKigen 2600 Nen no PlayballMetropolisOhayō! SpankSF Fancy FreeSF MixSusano OhThe Thief Akikazu InoueThe VampiresThe Wonderful Journey1980s
198021st Century AdventureAiiro ShinwaThe Amazing 3Ambassador MagmaAndromeda StoriesThe Cactus KidChibidonCinderella BoyGambler Jiko ChuushinhaHyotan KomakoMelody of IronLemon KidNanako SOSNumber 7Rainbow FortressRise of the BirdmenThe Road to Utopian LurueRoppu-kunTsubasa Aru MonoX-Point on the South PacificYokohama Monogatari1981Ashita Tenki ni NaareAyakoBig XCaptain OzmaConbini EnchouDororoFang of the Sun DougramThe Flower of KikuchiyoHimitsu Shirei 0059The Kabocha WineLady LoveLet's Go! Shun-chanLittle FishermanThe Monster of the 38th ParallelMusashi and KojiroNanto MagorokuNormanThe Runaway TankerSoup ManSpat Man XTange SazenTurtle Tales1982AkiraAdventure Broadcasting StationAstro Boy ChroniclesAstro Boy SpecialBarbaraBats & TerryThe CraterThe Devil GaronDiary of Ma-chanDon DraculaHakuriki SenseiI Am Sarutobi!I.LThe Jungle KingdomKōtarō Makaritōru!Lost WorldLunatic JapanThe Magic HouseMen with TailsMicroid SThe Mysterious UndergroundPippyPlamo-KyoshiroRags & JewelsQueer Arabian NightsShort ArabesqueSon of GodfatherSuspicionVolcanic EruptionSwallowing the EarthUnder the Air1983Aoi-chan Panic!Armored Trooper VotomsAura Battler DunbineBarabanbaBaribari LegendBe-Bop High SchoolThe Book of Human InsectsBuddhaBurunga IClockwork AppleDr. DoronkoThe Euphrates TreeGinga Hyōryū VifamIkki MandaraIron MuscleIronfist ChinmiJiletta from Upside-DownKosaku ShimaMako, Rumi and ChiiPaper FortressQueen EggplantThunder MaskUnicoYaketpachi's Maria1984Attacker You!BodaijuEkushisuGum Gum PunchHeavy Metal L-GaimKikou Kai GallianManga Seminar on BiologyMarvelous MelmoMeimon! Takonishi OuendanMobile Suit Gundam MS SenkiNew Treasure IslandPeace ConcertPia no ShouzouRC KidRoboRobo CompanySports Robo GarrettWhat's Michael?1985AppleseedCooking PapaDarling KishidanFly! RallyJigyaku no UtaMobile Suit Zeta GundamThe Transformers1986Bataashi KingyoCleopatra DCDai-Tōkyō Binbō Seikatsu ManualG.I. JoeIkenai Luna Sensei!Mienai SakebiMister AjikkoMobile Suit Gundam ZZN.Y. KomachiShakotan BoogieSpirit of WonderYou're Under Arrest19873×3 EyesBarabanba 2Break ShotGoku Midnight EyeKuchibiru kara SandanjuuMeimon! Daisan-yakyūbuMiss! PoliceOsomatsu-kunShin Plamo KyoshiroShura no MonTransformers: The Headmasters1988Doctor KThe Life of Genius Professor YanagizawaOh My Goddess!Okusama ShinkaronRonin WarriorsShiratori Reiko de Gozaimasu!Showa: A History of JapanThe Silent ServiceSuper MarioTransformers: Super-God MasterforceWaru19891+2=ParadiseAdesugata Junjo BoyBio HunterDear BoysGhost in the ShellGoldfish Warning!Hajime no IppoHyper Frenzy Gundam BoyLove YouMobile Guit Gundam 0080: War in the PocketMutsu Enmei-ryū Gaiden: Shura no TokiParasyteRock'n Game BoySD Gundam Gaiden Knight Gundam Monogatari Lacoa no YuushaTransformers: Victory1990s
1990Big in Japan, Putaro's FamilyCaptain KidChameleonDr. MarioGenji Tsūshin AgedamaGundlanderThe Legend of Mother SarahNaniwa Kin'yūdōOL ShinkaronOnnanoko no FushigiShonan Junai GumiShoot!Transformers: Zone1991Aah! HarimanadaBoys Be...Codename: Sailor VCompilerGanbare Goemon - Yukihime Kyuushutsu EmakiGhost in the Shell 1.5: Human-Error ProcessorGhost in the Shell 2: Man-Machine InterfaceGonGunsmith CatsHayate Densetsu Tokkō no TakuKurenai DensetsuMiracle GirlsMobile Suit Gundam F91MR. MasashiPeacemakerOnnanoko no HonkiSailor MoonShi to Kanojo to BokuWorld Apartment HorrorZeD1992Club 9Hayate Ultra NinpochoIce BladeKamen Rider SD: Mighty RidersThe Kindaichi Case FilesRockmanRockman 4Rockman 5Shirahime-Syo: Snow Goddess TalesShōnen yo Racket o IdakeShōta no SushiThe Walking ManWangan MidnightWeather Report Girl1993Angel GunfighterAtom Cat (Osamu Tezuka Complete Manga Works)Azuki-chanBagi, The Boss of the EarthBlade of the ImmortalThe Cat HouseownerChō Kuse ni NarisōDan Dan Danku!Fatal FuryFatal Fury 2The Four Fencers of the ForestGanbare Goemon 2 - Kiteretsu Shougun MagginesuGoldfish Warning! Gaiden Ushi Ushi WorldGringo (Osamu Tezuka Complete Manga Works)Hanada Shōnen ShiHello! ChippoHidamari no KiJ-DreamKiko-chan's SmileLudwig BMagic Knight RayearthMeteor PrinceMW (Osamu Tezuka Complete Manga Works)OnmyōjiPing-Pong ClubPornographic Pictures (Osamu Tezuka Complete Manga Works)Rockman 6RyūrōdenSay Hello to Bookila! (Osamu Tezuka Complete Manga Works)Sekai de Ichiban Yasashii OngakuShin Ganbare Goemon: Jigoku-henThe Secret of PironSoyokaze-sanThe Storm Fairy (Osamu Tezuka Complete Manga Works)Tales of the Glass CastleUnico [First Grader] (Osamu Tezuka Complete Manga Works)

19948 Man AfterA.I. Love YouThe Adventures of RubiBakugyaku FamiliaCave InDr. MarsFarewell, NightGakkou no Kowai UwasaGhost HuntHarlem BeatKidō Butōden G Gundam Gaiden Shōryū DensetsuMayaMobile Fighter G GundamMutant TurtlesPaprikaPlasmo WarsRainbow ParakeetRockman XSuper Mario / Donkey KongX-MenYokohama Kaidashi KikōYugo1995Chūka Ichiban!Daikaijū MonogatariDonkey Kong Country 4Koma Gag BattleDragon HeadDuke GoblinThe Earth WarInitial DFatal Fury 3Ganbare Goemon 3 - Shishi Juuroku Bee no Karakuri Manji GatameHenachoko Daisakusen ZJing: King of BanditsKokuhaku wo RequestThe Men Who Created Rockman: The Legend of Rockman's BirthMidnightMobile Suit Gundam WingMutant Turtles '95Neo FaustNonchan NoribenPrime RoseRockman 7Saiko DokutāSaint TailStreet Fighter II VSuper Donkey Kong with MarioTaimashinTaberemasenVendémiaire no TsubasaYoshi's Island 4Koma Gag Battle1996After War Gundam XBad CompanyCardcaptor SakuraDelicious!DESPERADOGanbare Goemon Kirakira DouchuuHALF & HALFKidō Butōden Gaiden Gundam Fight 7thKuroganeLovely AngelMarsMessage to AdolfMutant Turtles '96Osamu Tezuka Essay CollectionOsamu Tezuka Novel CollectionOsamu Tezuka Talk CollectionOsamu Tezuka’s Scenario CollectionOsamu Tezuka’s Special Manga CoursePokémon 4Koma Gag BattlePsychometrer EijiSchool Ghost Stories 2Super Mario 64Umi no Tairiku NOATobaku Mokushiroku Kaiji1997Akechi Case FilesBoys Be... 2nd SeasonCannon God ExaxxionCloverCyborg Kuro-chanDear Boys: Act 2Dear Boys: The Early DaysDetective Boy, Rock HolmesDevil LadyDream SagaEnomoto: New Elements that Shake the WorldG-TasteGachinko!Ganbaregoemon fu ~i ~ba aGreat Teacher OnizukaHiroki Endo's TanpenshuIcaroInugamiLast Bronx 4Koma Gag Battle Hinotama Game Comic SeriesLegendary Gambler TetsuyaMedarotMiami GunsMobile Suit Gundam Wing: Battlefield of PacifistsMobile Suit Gundam: Blue DestinyNew Mobile Report Gundam Wing Dual Story: G-UnitOsamu Tezuka Lecture CollectionPeach GirlQ.E.D.Rockman 8Rockman MANIAXSazae-sanSchool Ghost Stories 3SD Gundam Fullcolor TheaterSecrets of Osamu Tezuka’s MangaShin Tekken ChinmiShota no Sushi: Zenkokutaikai-henThe Story of Tonkara ValleyUltra Ninpocho KotobukiWansa-kunYume no Crayon Oukoku1998Ago Nashi Gen to Ore MonogatariBeast Wars II: Super Life-Form TransformersCyber Team in AkihabaraEden: It's an Endless World!Et CeteraForest of PianoFrom KobeGanbare Goemon - Neo Momoyama Bakufu no OdoriGundam Wing: Endless WaltzGuru Guru Pon-chanHey Pitan!Love HinaMicroman: The Small GiantMobile Suit Gundam: Char's CounterattackRockman & ForteSmall Giant MicromanShadow StarSuper Doll★Licca-chanUFO BabyUltra Ninpocho ChoVagabondZ Mazinger1999A Horse With No NameAmon: The Darkside of the DevilmanBaby PopBakushou Mondai no Kyou no JoeBeckThe Big OCuldceptFighting FoodonsFlint the Time DetectiveFuun Sanshimai Lin³GarōdenGetBackersGirl Got GameHiwou War ChroniclesJing: King of Bandits: Twilight TalesKitty Kitty FanciaThe Legend of MikazuchiLiquor Hermit DayoonMedarot 2Medarotter Rintaro! Medarot RMushishiNani wa tomo ArePersona 2: Tsumi: 4Koma Gag BattlePlanetesPower StonePsychic AcademyRave MasterSamurai Deeper KyoSuper Life-Form Transformers: Beast Wars NeoTransformers: Beast Wars TransmetalsTurn A GundamWild Arms Flower ThievesYui Shop2000s
2000Batman: Child of DreamsBuraiden GaiConfidential ConfessionsChobitsCromartie High SchoolDate GrooveDeus VitaeFLCLFlower of EdenGin no KodouGründenGyōten Ningen BatseelorInu Neko Jump!Karate Shoukoushi Kohinata MinoruMaken X AnotherMedarot 3Microman Red PowersMokkeNasuNOiSEOjamajo DoremiPlastic Babies: Megami Ibunroku Persona & Persona 2: TsumiRed EyesSD Gundam EiyudenShana ou YoshitsuneShin Megami Tensei: Devil ChildrenSkies of ArcadiaSunō DorufinTobaku Hakairoku KaijiTokyo Mew MewTramps Like UsUltra CuteVampire Master Dark CrimsonW'sThe WallflowerXenonZipang20013.3.7 Byooshi!!A Perfect Day for Love LettersBaby BirthBig Star DaikichiCrush Gear TurboDead EndDetective School QDragon VoiceGetter Robo ArmageddonGodHand TeruGolden Sun 4-Koma Gag BattleGorioGyōten Ningen Batseelor ~Gattsu to Oruka no Bouken Densetsu~Hot ShotHowlingIdatenInstant Teen: Just Add NutsJipangu HououdenKamen Rider SpiritsKoi KazeKunimitsu no MatsuriMagical Shopping Arcade AbenobashiMedarot 4Medarot 5Medarot NaviMonkey TyphoonMōtto! Ojamajo DoremiNodame CantabileOhikkoshiOthelloParallelPugyuruSakuranSD Gundam Mushamaruden TrilogyShadow SkillShaolin Sisters: RebornSharakuShin Megami Tensei: 4Koma Gag BattleShin Megami Tensei: Comic AnthologyShin Megami Tensei: Devil ChildrenShin Megami Tensei: Devil Children: 4Koma Gag BattleTelepathic WanderersYume TsukaiZodiac P.I.2002Air GearAno Hi o Shiru Mono wa Saiwai DearuCross OverDaihyoubitoES (Eternal Sabbath)Free Collars KingdomGacha GachaGenshikenHiganjimaJigoro JigorouJump ManKagetoraKyō no Go no NiLifeLittle Buster QLittle ForestMamotte! LollipopMegaten All-Stars Devils ArcMermaid Melody Pichi Pichi PitchMonsters, Inc.Mr. DrillerMurikuriMy Heavenly Hockey ClubOtogi no Machi no RenaPastelPumpkin ScissorsPuppet RevolutionRemoteRose Hip RoseSakura WarsSamus and JoeySchool RumbleShin Megami Tensei: Devil Children Light & DarkShin Daa! Daa! Daa!StoneUltra Ninpocho Teru2003Ahiru no SoraAlive: The Final EvolutionAshita no NadjaAvant-Garde YumekoBasiliskBig Windup!CapetaChanbaraChouseishin GransazerConfidential Confessions: DeaiCrush Gear NitroDensetsu no Head ShouDr. Mario-kunDragon ZakuraGold Rush!Ground Defense Force! Mao-chanGuilty Gear XtraHeat Guy JHistorieIS Otoko Demo Onna Demo Nai SeiIWGP - Denshi no HoshiJoshidaisei Kateikyoushi Hamanaka AiKamichama KarinLove RomaMagician Tantei AMajokko Tsukune-chanMe and the Devil BluesMedarot GMetroidMister Ajikko IIMobile Suit Gundam SEEDNegima! Magister Negi MagiPopotanQ-Ko-chanShin Megami Tensei: D-Children: Light & DarkSlut Girl +αTaiko no TatsujinTokyo Mew Mew à la ModeTsubasa: Reservoir ChronicleWalkin' ButterflyWild Base BallersWolf's RainxxxHolic2004Blame! AcademyBoys EstéGunsmith Cats BURSTCherry JuiceChi's Sweet HomeDrops of GodDrowning LoveDynamic HeroesFood Hunter FutaraidenFutari wa Pretty CureGeGeGe no Kitaro R: A Thousand Yokai TaleHaou no KenHaruka SeventeenHataraki ManKami no ShizukuKitchen PrincessKurau Phantom MemoryLe Portrait de Petit CossetteLove Attack!Kouya ni Kemono DoukokusuMazinger AngelsMinami-keMobile Suit Gundam SEED DestinyMou, Shimasen karaMoyasimon: Tales of AgricultureNet Sphere EngineerOut LawPeach Girl: Sae's StoryPixie PopSaiko Dokutā KaikyōsukeSaru LockSD Gundam ForceSenpai to KanojoShamoShion no ŌSōryūdenSpider-Man JSugar Sugar RuneSuzukaSweet PoolsideTim Burton's The Nightmare Before ChristmasTobaku Datenroku KaijiTokkoUndercurrentVoices of a Distant StarWitchblade TakeruYakushiji Ryōko no Kaiki JikenboYugo the Negotiator2005090 - Eko to Issho.8 Man InfinityBokura no Sengoku HakkyuudenC.M.B.CesareCherry NightsCyborg Kuro-chan: Extra BattleDeltora QuestDevil EcstasyDevilman Mokushiroku: Strange daysDragon EyeFull SpecFutari wa PreCure Max HeartGankutsuou: The Count of Monte CristoHaridama Magic Cram SchoolHell GirlHyouge MonoIdaten JumpJunji Ito's Cat Diary: Yon & Mu'Kenka ShōbaiKenkō Zenrakei Suieibu UmishōKilala PrincessKissxsisKoma KomaKurau Phantom MemoryLe Chevalier D'EonMetroid Prime 2: EchoesMetroid Prime Episode of AetherNinja GirlsOver DrivePanic × PanicPrincess ResurrectionSayonara, Zetsubou-SenseiSakura Wars: Show TheaterShinjuku SwanShugo Chara!Sumire 17-sai!!Sweet ValerianToto!: The Wonderful AdventureTrain Man: A Shōjo MangaVinland SagaVoices of a Distant StarThe Yagyu Ninja Scrolls2006Ace of DiamondAishiteru: KaiyōAmefurashiAngel's FrypanAventuraB.B.D Big Bad DaddyBakeneko Anzu-chanBoku no ShiawaseCrack!!CompanionDemon Prince EnmaDo Suru!? ParadiseFairy TailFantastic Detective LabyrinthFashion Leader Imai ShoutarouFlunk Punk RumbleFutari wa Pretty Cure Splash StarGentle-sanGoblinGoki-chanGon-chanGun Princess ~Sincerely Night~Hammer Session!Hen SemiHotaruna MysticIdol no AkahonJoppare Shun!The Knight in the AreaMai's RoomMinima!Modotte! Mamotte! Lollipop!Mobile Suit Gundam AliveMonster SoulMysterious Girlfriend XNegima!?Night Head GenesisOjamajin Yamada-kun!!Okko's InnPhoenix Wright: Ace AttorneyThe Place Promised in Our Early DaysPsycho BustersRespect GundamRoboo!Saint Young MenSD Gundam Musha Banchō FūunrokuShinyaku "Kyojin no Hoshi": HanagataSmash!Sumire 16 sai!!Tales of Princess MimiaTekken Chinmi LegendsTokyo AliceTotsugeki Chicken!Umi no Tairiku NOA PLUS+Winning TicketYozakura Quartet2007Altair: A Record of BattlesAngel Bank: Dragon Zakura GaidenBaby StepsBloody MondayChihayafuruFour-Eyed PrinceGeGeGe no Kitaro: A Thousand Yokai TalesGiant KillingGregory Horror ShowHell Girl: Enma Ai Selection, Super Scary StoryHeroic AgeI Am Here!Kabu no IsakiKamichama Karin ChuKotetsudenKujibiki UnbalanceOh! Edo RocketPapillonPaprika: The Dream-ChildRyūrōden: Chugen Ryōran-henSatanikus Enma KerberosSD Gundam The Three KingdomsSeitokai YakuindomoSky GirlsSpace BrothersTobaku Haōden ZeroTonari no 801-chan: Fujoshiteki Kōkō SeikatsuWhat Did You Eat Yesterday?Yes! PreCure 5Yondemasuyo, Azazel-san2008A Town Where You LiveAoi-sama ga Ikasete AgeruApocrypha Getter Robot DashAyakashiBilly BatBlame!²Blazer DriveBuster Keel!Cage of EdenCinema-kunCode:BreakerCoppelionEdogawa GeorgeEmmaGyaruo the Bakutan!HimeanōruHoly TalkerHonto ni Atta! Reibai SenseiThe iDOLM@STER Break!Imasugu Click!Junjou Karen na Oretachi da!Kimitaka no Ateru!Lancelot Full ThrottleLove's ReachKikai Shōnen MegaboyKitsune no YomeiriKurōbi! HayataMAGiCOMajimagumi Hunter Mikuni Shin no Karyūdo SeikatsuMagatsuhi.comMaria the Virgin WitchMeitantei Pashiri-kun!Monster Hunter OrageMotekiMukōgawa no MasakaMy Little MonsterOctaveOtouto Catcher Ore Pitcher De!Out Code: Chōjō Hanzai Tokumu SōsakanPrincess JellyfishReal DriveSay I Love YouSchool Rumble ZShugo Chara-chan!TeppuTytaniaunCassandraYes PreCure 5 GoGo!Zettai Hakase Kolisch2009A-bout!Ace Attorney Investigations: Miles EdgeworthAkatsukiAll Esper Dayo!Animal LandArisaAttack on TitanBloody Monday Season2 ~Pandora no Hako~Brass Boy!Dear Boys: Act 3Double-JGamaranGE – Good EndingGTO: 14 Days in ShonanF FinalThe Flowers of EvilFresh Pretty Cure!Genshiken: Second SeasonGhost in the Shell: S.A.C. - TachikomaticGhost in the Shell: Stand Alone ComplexJoshirakuKaitanKaze to KaminariShin Kamen Rider SpiritsKnights of SidoniaKokkoku: Moment by MomentL♥DKLimitMardock ScrambleMashiro no OtoMissions of LoveMuromi-sanNew Hell GirlNodame Cantable: Encore Opera ChapterNuts To Make You An Adult TwoŌkami Kakushi: Metsushi no ShōPeepo ChooSankarea: Undying LoveShikabane 13-gōSpray KingTobaku Datenroku Kaiji: Kazuya-henTsumuji VS.Wangan Midnight: C1 Runner2010s
20105 Centimeters per SecondAishiteru ~Kizuna~AKB49: Ren'ai Kinshi JōreiBlack OutBun Bun BeeDemon From AfarDescending Stories: Showa Genroku Rakugo ShinjuFurimukuna Kimi waGin no SpoonGurazeniHammer Session!He's My Only VampireHell Girl RHiganjima: Saigo no 47 NichikanHouse of the SunJirashin DiabloKachou ReijouLiar × LiarLovePlus Rinko DaysManga DogsMontageNegihoNoragamiOniwaka to Ushiwaka: Edge of the WorldSabagebu!Shugo Chara! Encore!Shura no Mon: Daini MonShura no Mon: FudekageTsukuroi Tatsu HitoWandering IslandWitchcraft Works2011Again!!As the Gods WillBakudan! - Bakumatsu DanshiBattle Angel Alita: Last OrderBloody Monday Final SeasonWild Cherry NightsDragon Collection: Ryū o Suberu MonoElegant Yokai Apartment LifeGod Eater: Kyūseishu no KikanHana-kun to Koisuru WatashiHitsuji no KiIf Her Flag BreaksImori 201Kono Kanojo wa Fiction DesuLovely MucoMaga-TsukiMy Wife is Wagatsuma-sanNo. 6Phi Brain: Saigo no PuzzlePrison SchoolPsychometrerReal GirlSanzoku DiarySherlock BonesStar ChildrenSuite PreCureTobaku Haōden Zero: Gyanki-henTown Doctor Jumbo!!Welcome to the BallroomYour Lie in AprilYuki ni TsubasaZeus no Tane20128♀1♂Aho-GirlAi ni Iku yoAjin: Demi-HumanAkumu no Sumu Ie: Ghost HuntAll Out!!Ani-ImoAttack on Titan: Junior HighCherry Nights RChotto MorimashitaDevil SurvivorFlying WitchFrom the New WorldGodHand Teru: Kamigami no SouhekiGT-RIxion SagaK: Memory of RedK: Stray Dog StoryKōnodoriKyō no Kira-kunLand of the LustrousLesson of the EvilMarine Corps YumiNaqua-DenNigeru wa Haji da ga Yaku ni TatsuOtokodama RockOutbreak CompanyP and JKRakugomon The Seven Deadly SinsSmile PreCure!Stella Women’s Academy, High School Division Class C³Tsubasa World Chronicle: Nirai Kanai-henYamada-kun and the Seven WitchesZipang: Shinsō Kairyū20134-koma ShīkyūbuA Silent VoiceA-bout!! - Asagiri Daikatsuyaku HenAcma: GameAs the Gods Will: The Second SeriesAttack on Titan: Before the FallAttack on Titan: No RegretsBayonetta: Bloody FateCharonClockwork PlanetComplex AgeDaysDevils' LineDokiDoki! PreCureGanbare Goemon - Yukihime Kyuushutsu EmakiThe Garden of WordsGhost in the Shell: AriseHanebado!Hangyaku no Kage TsukaiHello!!The Heroic Legend of ArslanIchi-FK: Days of BlueKasaneKiss Him, Not MeKyou no JovolleyLastmanMacmillan no Joshi YakyuubuRivnesRose Guns Days Fukushū wa Ōgon no KaoriSeisen Cerberus: Mō Hitori no EiyūSekkachi Hakushaku to Jikan DorobouShota no Sushi 2: World StageSilent Möbius QDSoredemo Boku wa Kimi ga SukiSpoof on TitanSweetness and LightningTakara no ZenTakato Case FilesTobaku Datenroku Kaiji: One Poker-henTokkō Jimuin MinowaUQ Holder!YZQ ✕ DRRR!!xxxHolic: Rei20143×3 Eyes: Genjū no Mori no SōnanshaA Man Called PirateAbe no Iru MachiAi Tenchi Muyo!Alice in MurderlandBattle Angel Alita: Mars ChronicleBaymaxChain ChronicleCode Black: Lelouch of the Shred GuitarCorp ShitsurakuenDebusenDefying Kurosaki-kunDomestic GirlfriendFairy Tail Blue MistralFairy Tail ZeroGrand BlueGTO: Paradise LostGurazeni: Tokyo Dome-henFuukaHappinessCharge PreCure!Higanjima 48 Nichigo…Holiday LoveHow Not to Summon a Demon LordInterviews with Monster GirlsInuyashikiJunketsu no Maria ExhibitionKaitō RubanKimi wo MawashitaiKomori-chan wa Yaruki wo DaseLove and LiesNinja Slayer KillsProfessional Henshuusha no YuugiPumpkin Scissors: Power SnipsReal AccountRengoku no KarmaRupodama!Mayoe! The Seven Deadly Sins Academy!Shinjuku DxDShinkai Tsuzuri no DokkairokuSono 'Okodawari', Ore ni mo Kure yo!Tenkei no ArimariaTetsu no OuTo the Abandoned Sacred BeastsTokyo Tarareba GirlsTsuredure ChildrenUnlimited FafnirWaiting for SpringWatashi no Muchi na Watashi no MichiWave, Listen to Me!2015Ace of Diamond Act IIAo-chan Can't Study!Attack on Titan: Lost GirlsBack Street GirlsBoarding School JulietCells at Work!Cyborg 009 VS DevilmanDaigo TokusouDekoboko AnimationDessert EagleFire ForceGleipnirGo! Princess PreCureHappinessHigh-Rise InvasionIn/SpectreInfection K: Dream of GreenKakushigoto: My Dad's Secret AmbitionMarriage ~The Drops of God Final Arc~MasukomiMuteki no HitoMr. Tonegawa: Middle Management BluesOccultic;NinePeach Boy RiversidePersona Q: Shadow of the Labyrinth – Side: P3Persona Q: Shadow of the Labyrinth – Side: P4Pinkyuu ★★★Q.E.D. iffThe Seven Deadly Sins ProductionShigatsu wa Kimi no Uso: CodaShoujo FujuubunThat Time I Got Reincarnated as a SlimeTomo-chan Is a Girl!20161-nichi Gaishutsuroku Hanchō3×3 Eyes: Kiseki no Yami no Keiyakusha6-senchii no Kizuna8-gatsu Outlaw1122: For a Happy MarriageAyanashiBattle Angel AlitaCardcaptor Sakura: Clear CardDanganronpa Gaiden: Killer KillerDear Boys: Over TimeDr. PrisonerDrifting DragonsFullbackHoshino, Me wo TsubutteThe Idolmaster Cinderella Girls U149I'm Standing on a Million LivesKoisuru Suizoku-manKono Ken ga Tsuki wo KiruMagical SempaiManaria FriendsMononote: Edo Shinobi KagyouNioh: The Golden SamuraiO Maidens in Your Savage SeasonPeach Girl NextPretty Boy Detective ClubRage of BahamutRyūrōden: Ouha Rikkoku-henSenryu GirlSeton Academy: Join the Pack!The Seven Deadly Sins: King's Road to MangaShe and Her CatTenohira no Netsu woShutoko SPL - Ginkai no SpeedsterVector BallThunderbolt FantasyTo Your EternityTricksterUntil Your Bones RotWitch Hat AtelierWitchy PreCure!2017A.I.C.O. -Incarnation-Another Side:EarthboundAre You Lost?Bacteria at WorkBlue PeriodBurn the House DownChaos;Child: Children's CollapseChihayafuru: Chuugakusei-henChūka Ichiban! KiwamiCrusher Joe RebirthDon't Toy With Me, Miss NagatoroFate/Grand Order -turas realta-The Great ClericHigh&Low: G-SwordThe Idolmaster Cinderella Girls After20Kessen no KuonKino's Journey: The Beautiful WorldKirakira PreCure a la ModeMobile Suit Gundam: Twilight AXISOhayou SurviveThe Ouka Ninja ScrollsPrincess Resurrection NightmareThe Quintessential QuintupletsRakuraku ShinwaRanker's HighRent-A-GirlfriendSaint Cecilia and Pastor LawrenceSeishun SoukanzuSensei, SukidesuSeraph of the End: Guren Ichinose: Catastrophe at SixteenThe Seven Deadly Sins: Seven Days ~The Thief and the Holy Girl~Shima Kōsaku no Jiken-boSmile Down the RunwayTobaku Datenroku Kaiji: 24 Oku Dasshutsu-henTokyo Tarareba Girls Extra Edition: Tarare BarTsue Petit Mahou Tsukai ♀ no Bouken no ShoUma Musume Pretty DerbyWhy the Hell are You Here, Teacher!?With a Dog AND a Cat, Every Day is FunYomawari Neko2018BakemonogatariCells at Work! Code BlackCells that Don't WorkEdens ZeroFairy Tail: 100 Years QuestGamaran: ShuraA Girl & Her Guard DogGurazeni: Pa League-henHeavenly DelusionThe Hidden Dungeon Only I Can EnterHitmanHugtto! PreCureThe King of Fighters: A New BeginningKiss and CryJūshinki no Pandora 0The Masterful Cat Is Depressed Again TodayMegaloboxMy Roomie Is a DinoMy Unique Skill Makes Me OP Even at Level 1OrientPandora Men’s DiningPrincess Connect! Re:DiveRemake Our Life!Shaman King: Red CrimsonShaman King: The Super StarTenPuruThe Slime Diaries: That Time I Got Reincarnated as a SlimeTensei Shitara Shachiku Datta KenThis Man: Sono Kao wo Mita Mono ni wa Shi woTokyo Tarareba Girls ReturnsThe Witches of AdamasYoru ni naru to Boku waZombie Land Saga2019Am I Actually the Strongest?BabylonCells at Work! FriendFairy GoneHypnosis Mic: Division Rap Battle: Before the Battle: The Dirty DawgHypnosis Mic: Division Rap Battle: Side B.B. & M.T.CHypnosis Mic: Division Rap Battle: Side F.P & MLove After World DominationNina the Starry BrideRaging LoopSen wa, Boku wo EgakuShaman KingShaman King: FlowersShaman King: ZeroShikimori's Not Just a CutieSketchyStar Twinkle PreCureTokyo Tarareba Girls Season 2Weathering with YouYuri is My Job!2020s
2020As a Reincarnated Aristocrat, I'll Use My Appraisal Skill to Rise in the WorldChiikawaA Couple of CuckoosHypnosis Mic -Division Rap Battle- side D.H & B.A.TI Was Reincarnated as the 7th Prince so I Can Take My Time Perfecting My Magical AbilityThe Iceblade Sorcerer Shall Rule the WorldIt's Just Not My NightMy Life as Inukai-san's Dog Platelets at WorkShaman King: MarcosTawawa on MondayTono & Stitch2021IshuraKaoru Hana wa Rin to SakuMy Lovesick Life as a '90s OtakuTesla NoteWind BreakerUnsorted
éX-Driver0→1RebirthBlue ScannerChou Musha Gundam Bushin KirahaganeChou Musha Gundam Musha Senki Hikari no Hengen HenChou Musha Gundam Tensei Shichinin ShuuChou Musha Gundam Touba DaishougunCompany GirlDoonto! Dragon Kid!Goldfish Warning! ReturnsFortune DogsHerohero-kunKeitai Denjū TelefangKeitai Denjū Telefang 2Kikai Wakusei GarakutaniaKōryū Densetsu VillgustNetsuretsu-teki How to GirlOchakumi EnjerusuPlamo Kyoshiro Musha GundamQ Robo TransformersSD Gundam Force Emaki MusharetsudenShake HipShi to Kanojo to Boku MeguruShi to Kanojo to Boku YukariShin Iyahaya-kunShin Musha Gundam Chou Kidou DaishougunShōkan-ō RekusuStar of Happiness HaghalTarpanTo HeavenTransformers Galaxy ForceUltra Ninja Manual FlashVampire SaviorVampire: Messenger of the End''

See also
List of works published by Kodansha
List of works published by Ichijinsha

References

Kodansha
K
Kodansha